BWG may refer to:

BWG, the IATA and FAA LID code for Bowling Green–Warren County Regional Airport, an airport in Bowling Green, Kentucky
BWG, the National Rail code for Bowling railway station, West Dunbartonshire, Scotland
BWG, the OACI code for Blue Wings, a defunct charter airline based in Germany
BWG Foods, an Irish wholesaler and retail grocery franchise operator